Francisco Clavet was the defending champion, but the eighth seeded Spaniard lost in the quarterfinals to Carlos Moyá. Sláva Doseděl won in the final 7–6(7–4), 7–6(7–5), 6–7(4–7), 6–2 against number one seed Carlos Moyà and captured his third and last title of his professional career.

Seeds
Champion seeds are indicated in bold while text in italics indicates the round in which that seed was eliminated.

Draw

Finals

Section 1

Section 2

External links
 ATP main draw

Singles